Zach is a German and Czech surname. Notable people with the name include:

 Anton von Zach (1747–1826), Austrian general
 Erwin von Zach (1872–1942), Austrian diplomat and sinologist
 Franz Xaver von Zach (1754–1832), Austrian astronomer
 Alexander Zach (born 1976), Austrian politician
 František Zach (1807–1892), Czech-born soldier, military theorist and freedom fighter
 Hilde Zach (1942–2011), first woman mayor of Innsbruck, Austria
 Jan Zach (1699–1773), Czech composer, violinist and organist
 Michal Zach (born 1969), Czech football manager 
 Nathan Zach (1930–2020), Israeli poet

See also
 Zack (disambiguation)
 Izak (disambiguation)
 Zacha

German-language surnames
Czech-language surnames
Surnames from given names